Huselske is an urban-type settlement in Makiivka Municipality (district) in Donetsk Oblast of eastern Ukraine. Population:

Demographics
Native language as of the Ukrainian Census of 2001:
 Ukrainian 10.62%
 Russian 88.58%
 Bulgarian 0.4%
 Belarusian 0.07%

References

Urban-type settlements in Donetsk Raion